Micraspis is a genus of the ladybird family. The genus was erected by Louis Alexandre Auguste Chevrolat in 1837

Species
Species of the genus include:
Micraspis discolor (Fabricius, 1798)
Micraspis flavovittata (Crotch, 1874)
Micraspis frenata (Erichson, 1842)
Micraspis lineola (Fabricius, 1775)
Micraspis striata (Fabricius, 1792)

References

 

Coccinellidae genera